Pioz is a municipality located in the province of Guadalajara, Castile-La Mancha, Spain.

References

External links 

Municipalities in the Province of Guadalajara